Persatuan Sepak Bola Indonesia Kota Sungai Penuh, commonly known as simply Persikota Sungai Penuh, is a Indonesia association football club based in Sungai Penuh, Jambi. The football club currently plays in Liga 3 which is the last tier in Indonesian football.

References

Football clubs in Indonesia
Football clubs in Jambi
Association football clubs established in 2010
2010 establishments in Indonesia